Dōngfāng may refer to:

Dongfang Electric, a Chinese corporation engaged in the manufacturing of power generators
A Chinese compound surname Dongfang
Dongfang Shuo
Dongfang Bubai

Locations in China 
Dongfang, Hainan, county-level city
Dongfang Road, major street in Pudong, Shanghai
Dongfang, Jinyun County, town in Jinyun County, Zhejiang
Subdistricts
Dongfang Subdistrict, Shantou, in Jinping District, Shantou, Guangdong
Dongfang Subdistrict, Shangqiu, in Suiyang District, Shangqiu, Henan
Dongfang Subdistrict, Xiangcheng City, in Xiangcheng City, Henan

See also
 China Orient Asset Management
 Orient Group
 Orient Securities
 Dongfeng (disambiguation)
 Toho (disambiguation) (Japanese equivalent)